Melquicedec Torres (born May 27, 1977 in San Pedro de Macorís, Dominican Republic) is a former professional baseball pitcher. He played one year for the Hyundai Unicorns of the Korea Baseball Organization. He is the younger brother of pitcher Salomón Torres.

Minor league career
He began  in Wisconsin, but was later promoted to the Class A-Advanced Lancaster JetHawks and then the Triple-A Tacoma Rainiers. He returned to the Mariners' new Class-A Advanced team, the San Bernardino Stampede, . In 2002, Torres pitched in Hyundai Unicorns, Korea.

He was granted free agency following the season. That season, he played with their Class-A Advanced Frederick Keys and Double-A Bowie Baysox.

In , Torres played for the Vaqueros Laguna and Piratas de Campeche of the Liga Mexicana de Beisbol. In January , he was signed to a minor league contract by the Milwaukee Brewers organization and was assigned to their Triple-A Nashville Sounds.

References

External links

1977 births
Living people
Arizona League Mariners players
Bowie Baysox players
Dominican Republic expatriate baseball players in Mexico
Dominican Republic expatriate baseball players in South Korea
Dominican Republic expatriate baseball players in the United States
Everett AquaSox players
Frederick Keys players
Huntsville Stars players
Hyundai Unicorns players
KBO League pitchers
Lancaster JetHawks players
Lynchburg Hillcats players
Mexican League baseball pitchers
Nashville Sounds players
Piratas de Campeche players
San Bernardino Stampede players
Tacoma Rainiers players
Vaqueros Laguna players
Wisconsin Timber Rattlers players